Zalduendo de Álava is a village in Álava, Basque Country, Spain.

Populated places in Álava

es:Zalduendo de Álava